Mathew Ladgrove, known professionally as Wongo, is an Australian electronic dance music producer and DJ. He is most known for his song "Groove Society" with Canadian DJ A-Trak Matt is the founder of his own label, 'Box of Cats'. His song 'Fireball' Feat. Rubi Du, peaked at number 5 on the Top 50 Aria Club charts.

Discography

Singles

EPs
Wiggle Out Ep (2009)
Beat The Game Ep (2015)
Periodicals (2016)
Redline Ep (2018)

References

External links
 Website

Living people
Year of birth missing (living people)